Drinan is a rural locality in the Bundaberg Region, Queensland, Australia. In the  Drinan had a population of 170 people.

History 
The locality took its name from the railway station name, assigned by the Queensland Railways Department on 4 September 1919, named after property owner Mr Drinan.

Drinan Provisional School opened in February 1927. In 1954 it became Drinan State School. It closed in 1963.

In the  Drinan had a population of 170 people.

References 

Bundaberg Region
Localities in Queensland